The Serbia men's national under-19 basketball team is the boys' basketball team, administered by Basketball Federation of Serbia, that represents Serbia in international under-19 (under age 19) men's basketball competitions, consisting mainly of the FIBA Under-19 Basketball World Cup.

History

Individual awards
Most Valuable Player
 Milan Mačvan — 2007

World Cup All-Tournament Team
 Aleksandar Cvetković — 2011
 Vasilije Micić — 2013
 Nikola Jović — 2021

Statistical leaders: Points
 Marko Pecarski – 2019

Statistical leaders: Top Performers
 Filip Petrušev – 2019

World Cup competitive record

Coaches

Rosters

See also
 Serbian men's university basketball team
 Serbia men's national under-20 basketball team
 Serbia men's national under-18 basketball team
 Serbia men's national under-17 basketball team
 Serbia men's national under-16 basketball team

References

External links
 Basketball Federation of Serbia

M U19
Men's national under-19 basketball teams